Danielle Paultre (born January 25, 1994), better known by the ring-name Willow Nightingale, is an American professional wrestler currently signed to All Elite Wrestling (AEW). She is best known for her tenures with  Ring of Honor and Shimmer Women Athletes.

Professional Wrestling Career

Independent Circuit (2015–present) 
Willow was trained by Mike Mondo at the New York Wrestling Connection in Deer Park NY. On February 27, 2015, Nightingale made her professional wrestling debut on NYWC 'We Can Do It' event where Nightingale lost to Sammy Pickles. A year after her debut, Nightingale won the NYWC Starlet Championship. On November 21, 2018, on Shimmer Volume 108 Nightingale faced Dust for the Heart of Shimmer Championship which she lost. After holding the NYWC Starlet Championship since February 2016 Nightingale eventually lost to Kris Statlander on  February 23, 2019. Nightingale reclaimed the NYWC Startlet Championship on January 25, 2020, facing Tina San Antonio in a steel cage match. On February 26, 2022, Nightingale faced Johnny Radke, Dino Might and John Silver for the NYWC Fusion Title which Nightingale won.

All Elite Wrestling (2021–present) 
On May 3, 2021, Nightingale made her AEW debut competing on AEW Dark Elevation facing Thunder Rosa, to whom she lost. On April 8, 2022, on AEW Rampage, Nightingale participated in the AEW Owen Hart Cup, losing to Red Velvet in the qualifying round. On June 17 on Road Rager, Nightingale challenged Jade Cargill for the AEW TBS Championship, which Nightingale lost. Nightingale challenged for the championship again at Battle of the Belts IV, losing once again. On October 21, at AEW Rampage it was announced that Nightingale was signed to the company.

Ring of Honor (2021–present) 
On June 6, 2021, Nightingale made her Ring of Honor debut on ROH's 'Women's Division Wednesday' show where she faced Alex Gracia and picked up the win. On August 4, Nightingale competed in the ROH Women's World Championship tournament to determine the inaugural championship she faced Allysin Kay in the first round who she lost to. On December 3 Nightingale faced Mandy Leon in a number one contendership match for the women's championship which Nightingale won. Then on December 11 on ROH Final Battle Nightingale faced Rok-C for the ROH Women's World Championship which Nightingale lost.On April 1, 2022, on Supercard of Honor Nightingale faced Mercedes Martinez for the interim ROH Women's World Championship but was defeated.

Championships and accomplishments 
 New York Wrestling Connection
 NYWC Starlet Championship (2 times)
 NYWC Fusion Championship (1 time)
 Chikara
 Chikara Campeonatos de Parejas (1 time) – with Solo Darling
 Pro Wrestling Illustrated
 Ranked No. 40 of the top 150 female wrestlers in the PWI Women's 150 in 2022
 Queens of Combat
 QOC Tag Team Championship (1 time) – with Faye Jackson
 Women's Wrestling Revolution
 Tournament for Tomorrow (2018) – with Solo Darling

References

External links 

 
 

1994 births
American female professional wrestlers
African-American female professional wrestlers
Living people
Professional wrestlers from New York (state)
21st-century professional wrestlers
All Elite Wrestling personnel